Royal Never Give Up (RNG) is a Chinese esports organization whose League of Legends team competes in the League of Legends Pro League. It was established in May 2015. RNG won the 2016 LPL Spring Playoffs, 2018 LPL Spring Playoffs and 2018 LPL Summer Playoffs, and is the champion of the 2018, 2021, and 2022 Mid-Season Invitational. Its sister team is Royal Club. The organization also has a Dota 2 team, which participated in The International 2019.

League of Legends

History

2016 

By winning a champion and a second in the spring and summer, RNG qualified for the 2016 World Championship.

2017 

In the 2017 LPL Spring Season, RNG was placed in the Group A and won first place. In the 2017 LPL Spring Playoffs, RNG defeated EDG in semifinals with a score of 3:1. However, they were beaten by WE in finals with a score of 0:3. They lost the ticket to 2017 Mid-Season Invitational.

In June, RNG won the Demacia Cup Summer 2017 Playoffs in Changsha. In July, RNG helped LPL get its first championship of Rift Rivals. In the 2017 LPL Summer Playoffs, RNG defeated Team WE with a score of 3–2 in semifinals. They were defeated again in the finals by EDG with a score of 2–3.

Although RNG got two runner-ups in spring and summer season, they gained enough points and got the ticket to the 2017 World Championship. RNG was placed in Group C and won first place in the group stage. During their quarterfinals, they defeated FNC with a score of 3–1, and was defeated by SK Telecom T1 in the semifinals.

2018 
In the 2018 LPL Spring Playoffs, RNG defeated WE in two rounds. They defeated Invictus Gaming in the semifinals and EDG in the finals. In the 2018 Mid-Season Invitational, the team won first place in the group stage. During the first-place tiebreaker, RNG defeated KZ from LCK with a score of 3–1.

In June, RNG won the championship of Demacia Cup Summer 2018 Playoffs in Zhuhai. In July, RNG helped LPL get the championship of 2018 Rift Rivals. In the 2018 LPL Summer Playoffs, RNG defeated TOP with a score of 3–1.

After summer season, RNG won enough points to become eligible to participate in the 2018 World Championship, and placed first in the group stage. In the knockout stage, RNG lost the quarterfinals against G2.

Overwatch

References

External links 

 

 
2015 establishments in China
Esports teams based in China
League of Legends Pro League teams
Dota teams
Chengdu Hunters